Paranoá Esporte Clube, commonly known as Paranoá, is a Brazilian football club based in Paranoá, Distrito Federal. They competed in the Série C in once.

History
The club was founded on April 4, 2000. Paranoá won the Campeonato Brasiliense Second Level in 2004. They competed in the Série C in 2005, when they were eliminated in the Second Stage by Londrina.

Achievements

 Campeonato Brasiliense Second Level:
 Winners (1): 2004

Stadium
Paranoá Esporte Clube play their home games at Estádio JK Paranoá, nicknamed Estádio JK. The stadium has a maximum capacity of 6,000 people.

References

Association football clubs established in 2000
Football clubs in Federal District (Brazil)
2000 establishments in Brazil